Heinrich Drake (December 20, 1881 – June 12, 1970) was a German politician (SPD). He was President of the Free State of Lippe from 1925 to 1933 and again from 1945 to 1947, until Lippe was incorporated into the new state of North Rhine-Westphalia. For a short period in 1945/46, he also served as President of the neighbouring state of Schaumburg-Lippe, which later became part of Lower Saxony. He was born in Lemgo and died in Detmold.

External links 
Westfälische Geschichte: Biography – Heinrich Drake 

1881 births
1970 deaths
Social Democratic Party of Germany politicians
Members of the Reichstag of the Weimar Republic
People from Lemgo